Windsor Football Club was an Australian association football club founded in May 1915, and was based in the Melbourne suburb of Windsor wearing an all purple kit with a gold sash. The short lived club is known for its Victorian first tier champions in 1921, and for playing a charity friendly match in Geelong on 26 April 1920, against the crews of HMAS Platypus and its accompanying submarines. The club achieved two league championships, and reached the final of the Dockerty Cup twice, losing both times. The club was dormant for seven years (1925 to 1931) and resumed competitive fixtures in 1932. The club folded at the conclusion of the 1934 season alongside fellow tier one winner St Kilda and several other clubs. This club has no connection to the club of the same name that competed in the 1970 season of the Victorian state tier seven league.

Honours
Dockerty Cup
Runners-up (2): 1919, 1922
Victorian First Tier
Champions (1): 1921
Victorian Third Tier
Runners-up (1): 1933
Victorian Fourth Tier
Champions (1): 1932

References

Soccer clubs in Melbourne
Association football clubs established in 1915
1915 establishments in Australia
Victorian Premier League teams
1934 disestablishments in Australia
Association football clubs disestablished in 1934
Defunct soccer clubs in Australia